Mansour Mohamed Al-Muslah is a Qatari businessman, and is most recognized for his work in Qatar’s banking industry and is member of Qatar’s ruling family.  He is a powerful Qatari citizen who plays a prominent role in Qatar's business world. He received his Bachelor's degree in Social Science from Qatar University.

Career 
In his early career al-Moslah worked in various posts for Qatar's Ministries of Interior and Defense. Through his work at the Ministry of Interior, al-Moslah served as the director of Sheikh Abdullah bin Khaled al-Thani’s personal office. As a member of Qatar’s ruling family, Al-Thani previously served as the minister of religious affairs, and headed the Ministry of Interior until 2013.   

Later in his career he was appointed the Non-Executive Director of Solidarity Group Holding BSC.  

He was the chairman of Aqar Real Estate Investment and Development.

Al-Muslah is the chairman at Al Andalus Private Schools, the chairman of the Board of Trustees at the Mayfair Islamic Center - London. He also sits on the board of directors at both Qatar Islamic Bank (QIB) and Al Jazeera Finance Company.  He has played the role of non-independent non-executive director of QIB since 1996, and has continued in this role as recent as his 2014 appointment by election at the bank's general assembly meeting. In the past, he was a board member at Tadhamon International Islamic Bank.

References

Living people
Qatar University alumni
Qatari bankers
Year of birth missing (living people)